General Brooke refers to Alan Brooke, 1st Viscount Alanbrooke (1883–1963), Chief of the Imperial General Staff during the Second World War. General Brooke may also refer to:

Arthur Brooke (British Army officer) (1772–1843), British Army lieutenant general
Christopher Brooke (British Army officer) (1869–1948), British Army brigadier general
Hugh Fenwick Brooke (1871–1948), British Army brigadier general
John R. Brooke (1838–1926), Union Army major general

See also
Robert Brooke-Popham (1878–1953), Royal Air Force general
Attorney General Brooke (disambiguation)